Nasaltus chinensis, is a species of clown beetle found in India, Sri Lanka, Pakistan and Australia.

References 

Histeridae
Insects of Sri Lanka
Insects described in 1806